The 1964 U.S. Senate election for the state of North Dakota was held November 3, 1964. The incumbent, Dem-NPL Senator Quentin Burdick, sought and received re-election to his second term, defeating Republican candidate Thomas S. Kleppe, who later became the United States Secretary of the Interior.

Only Burdick filed as a Dem-NPLer, and the endorsed Republican candidate was Thomas S. Kleppe, who served two terms as a Representative for North Dakota's second congressional district from 1967 to 1971. Burdick and Kleppe won the primary elections for their respective parties.

Election results

Notes

External links
1964 North Dakota U.S. Senate Election results

North Dak
1964
1964 North Dakota elections